This was the first edition of the tournament.

Tomislav Brkić and Ante Pavić won the title after defeating Walter Trusendi and Andrea Vavassori 6–2, 7–6(7–4) in the final.

Seeds

Draw

References
 Main Draw

Internazionali di Tennis Country 2001 Team - Doubles